Justice Hart may refer to:

James P. Hart, associate justice of the Texas Supreme Court
Jesse C. Hart, associate justice of the Arkansas Supreme Court
John De Hart, associate justice of the New Jersey Supreme Court
Josephine L. Hart, associate justice of the Arkansas Supreme Court
Ossian B. Hart, associate justice of the Florida Supreme Court
William L. Hart, associate justice of the Ohio Supreme Court